Celina is an unincorporated community in Saint Louis County, Minnesota, United States.

The community is located 18 miles west of Cook at the junction of State Highway 1 (MN 1) and Saint Louis County Highway 5 (CR 5).

The boundary line between Saint Louis, Itasca, and Koochiching counties is near Celina.

The communities of Greaney, Bear River, and Togo are nearby.

References

 Official State of Minnesota Highway Map – 2011/2012 edition

Unincorporated communities in Minnesota
Unincorporated communities in St. Louis County, Minnesota